John Puleston (by 1492 – 1551), of Carnarvon, Caernarvonshire and Bersham, Denbighshire, was a Welsh politician.

He had four sons, including MP, Robert Puleston, and five daughters.

He was a Member (MP) of the Parliament of England for Caernarvon Boroughs in 1542 and for Caernarvonshire in 1545 and 1547.

References

15th-century births
1551 deaths
16th-century Welsh politicians
People from Caernarfon
Members of the Parliament of England for Denbighshire
Members of Parliament for Caernarfon
English MPs 1542–1544
English MPs 1545–1547
English MPs 1547–1552